Atocion is a genus of flowering plants in the family Caryophyllaceae, tribe Sileneae, native to Europe, the Caucasus region, and the Middle East as far east as Iran. The species diversity is highest in the Balkans.

Species
Currently accepted species include:

Atocion armeria (L.) Raf.
Atocion compactum (Fisch. ex Hornem.) Tzvelev
Atocion lerchenfeldianum (Baumg.) M.Popp
Atocion reuterianum (Boiss. & Blanche) Frajman
Atocion rupestre (L.) Oxelman
Atocion scythicinum (Coode & Cullen) Frajman

References

Caryophyllaceae
Caryophyllaceae genera